is a Japanese voice actress currently affiliated with StarCrew. Her debut role was as Yoshino Takatsuki in Wandering Son, with major roles including Raphtalia in The Rising of the Shield Hero, Mai Sakurajima in Rascal Does Not Dream of Bunny Girl Senpai, Asuka Takizawa/Cure Flamingo in Tropical-Rouge! Pretty Cure, Chihaya Ayase in Chihayafuru, Shoko Sashinami in Valvrave the Liberator, Asagi Aiba in Strike the Blood, Mirage Farina Jenius in Macross Delta, Nobara Kugisaki in Jujutsu Kaisen and Konatsu Miyamoto in Tari Tari.

Filmography

Anime
2011
Anohana: The Flower We Saw That Day as young Atsumu Matsuyuki
Chihayafuru as Chihaya Ayase
Dog Days as Amelita Tremper
Ro-Kyu-Bu! as Kagetsu Hakamada
Wandering Son as Yoshino Takatsuki
2012
Lagrange: The Flower of Rin-ne as Lan
Magi: The Labyrinth of Magic as Ri Seishun
Senki Zesshō Symphogear as Aoi Tomosato
Tari Tari as Konatsu Miyamoto
2013
Aikatsu! as Raichi Hoshimiya, Shion Kamiya, and Mako Miyamoto
C3-Bu as Rin Haruna
Chihayafuru 2 as Chihaya Ayase
Cuticle Detective Inaba as Natsuki
Ro-Kyu-Bu! SS as Kagetsu Hakamada
Senki Zesshō Symphogear G as Aoi Tomosato
Strike the Blood as Asagi Aiba
Valvrave the Liberator as Shōko Sashinami
2014
Atelier Escha & Logy: Alchemists of the Dusk Sky as Wilbell voll Erslied
Baby Steps as Himeko Sasami
Haikyū!! as Yui Michimiya 
Magical Warfare as Kurumi Isoshima
Selector Infected WIXOSS as Iona "Yuki" Urasoe
Selector Spread WIXOSS as Iona "Yuki" Urasoe
Witch Craft Works as Ayaka Kagari
2015
Baby Steps Season 2 as Himeko Sasami
Charlotte as Medoki
Death Parade as Chiyuki 
Food Wars: Shokugeki no Soma as Miyoko Hōjō
Monster Musume as Kii
Overlord as CZ2128 Delta
Senki Zesshō Symphogear GX as Aoi Tomosato
Tokyo Ghoul √A as Akira Mado
Urawa no Usagi-chan as Usagi Takasago
Valkyrie Drive: Mermaid as Charlotte Scherzen
2016
Bungo Stray Dogs as Ichiyō Higuchi
Food Wars: The Second Plate as Miyoko Hōjō
Haruchika as Naoko Serizawa
Honobono Log as various characters
Kuromukuro as Mika Ogino
Macross Delta as Mirage Farina Jenius
Norn9 as Nanami Shiranui
Regalia: The Three Sacred Stars as Ingrid Tiesto
2017
A Centaur's Life as Rino Kimihara
Food Wars: The Third Plate as Miyoko Hōjō
Granblue Fantasy The Animation as Jessica
Hitorijime My Hero as Kaide-sensei
Natsume Yuujinchou Roku as Takuma Tsukiko
Pokémon Sun and Moon as Junsar (Officer Jenny)
Senki Zesshō Symphogear AXZ as Aoi Tomosato
2018
Katana Maidens as Yukari Origami
Kokkoku: Moment by Moment as Shoko Majima
Lost Song as Allu Lux
Miss Caretaker of Sunohara-sou as Sumire Yamanashi
Ongaku Shōjo as Eri Kumagai
Overlord III as CZ2128 Delta
Rascal Does Not Dream of Bunny Girl Senpai as Mai Sakurajima
The Seven Heavenly Virtues, Uriel
Tokyo Ghoul:re as Akira Mado
2019
Assassins Pride as Shinhua Tsvetok
B-Project: Zecchō Emotion as Tsubasa Sumisora
Bungo Stray Dogs 3 as Ichiyō Higuchi
Chihayafuru 3 as Chihaya Ayase
Isekai Quartet as CZ2128 Delta
Senki Zesshō Symphogear XV as Aoi Tomosato
The Magnificent Kotobuki as Leona
The Rising of the Shield Hero as Raphtalia
2020
Isekai Quartet 2 as CZ2128 Delta, Raphtalia
Jujutsu Kaisen as Nobara Kugisaki
My Next Life as a Villainess: All Routes Lead to Doom! as Gerald Stuart (childhood)
2021
Combatants Will Be Dispatched! as Heine
Fena: Pirate Princess as Fena Houtman
Scarlet Nexus as Kasane Randall
The Idaten Deities Know Only Peace as Pisara
Tropical-Rouge! Pretty Cure as Asuka Takizawa/Cure Flamingo
2022
Birdie Wing: Golf Girls' Story as Aoi Amawashi
Bleach: Thousand-Year Blood War as Shino Madarame
Extreme Hearts as Ashley Vancroft
Musasino! as Usagi Takasago
The Eminence in Shadow as Alpha
The Rising of the Shield Hero 2 as Raphtalia
2023
Birdie Wing: Golf Girls' Story Season 2 as Aoi Amawashi
Bullbuster as Arumi Nikaidō
Giant Beasts of Ars as Tsurugi
New Saga as Urza
Technoroid Overmind as Eliza
The Café Terrace and Its Goddesses as Akane Hōōji
Yuri Is My Job! as Nene Saionji
2024
Whisper Me a Love Song as Yori Asanagi

Anime films
Death Billiards (2013) as Chiyuki 
Girls und Panzer der Film (2015) as Kinuyo Nishi
Ongaku Shōjo (2015) as Eri Kumagai
The Laws of The Universe Part 0 (2015) as Anna
Pop In Q (2016) as Isumi Kominato
Selector Destructed WIXOSS (2016) as Iona "Yuki" Urasoe
Haikara-san ga Tōru (2017, 2018) as Tamaki Kitakōji
Macross Delta the Movie: Passionate Walküre  (2018) as Mirage Farina Jenius
Rascal Does Not Dream of a Dreaming Girl (2019) as Mai Sakurajima
Date A Live Fragment: Date A Bullet (2020) as Yui Sagakure
Eureka - Eureka Seven: Hi-Evolution (2021) as Ex Tora
Macross Delta the Movie: Absolute Live!!!!!! (2021) as Mirage Farina Jenius
Drifting Home (2022) as Natsume Tonai
The First Slam Dunk (2022) as Ayako
Rascal Does Not Dream of a Sister Venturing Out (2023) as Mai Sakurajima

Original video animation (OVA)
Code Geass: Akito the Exiled (2012) as Ferirri Baltrow
Hori-san to Miyamura-kun (2012–21) as Kyoko Hori
Under the Dog (2016) as Anthea Kallenberg
Strike the Blood II (2016–17) as Asagi Aiba
Mobile Suit Gundam: The Origin (2017) as Fan Li
Strike the Blood III (2018–19) as Asagi Aiba
Strike the Blood IV (2020–21) as Asagi Aiba
Strike the Blood V (2022) as Asagi Aiba

Original net animation (ONA)
Double Circle (2013) as Akane
B: The Beginning (2018) as Lily Hoshina
B: The Beginning Succession (2021) as Lily Hoshina
Ganbare Dōki-chan (2021) as Senpai-san
Star Wars: Visions - The Village Bride (2021) as F
Thermae Romae Novae (2022) as Mami Yamaguchi
Bastard!! Season 2 (2023) as Shella E. Lee

Video games
2010
Chaos Rings as Alto
2012
Atelier Ayesha: The Alchemist of Dusk as Wilbell voll Erslied
E.X. Troopers as Suage
Street Fighter X Tekken as Lili
2013
Atelier Escha & Logy: Alchemists of the Dusk Sky as Wilbell voll Erslied
NORN9 as Shiranui Nanami
Corpse Party 2: DEAD PATIENT as Ayame Itou
2014
Atelier Shallie: Alchemists of the Dusk Sea as Wilbell voll Erslied
Tales of Link as Kana
Shining Resonance as Sonia Blanche
2015
Granblue Fantasy as Jessica
Grand Sphere as Princess Stella
7th Dragon III Code: VFD as Rika
2017
Kantai Collection as Gangut/Oktyabrskaya Revolyutsiya and Kamoi
 Fire Emblem Heroes as Linde
 Magia Record: Puella Magi Madoka Magica Side Story as Asuka Tatsuki
 Azur Lane as FNFF Saint Louis and SN Sovetskaya Belorussiya
2018
Toaru Majutsu no Virtual On as Othinus
Girls' Frontline as Contender and IWS 2000
Schoolgirl Strikers 2 as Aoi Uraba 
2019Another Eden as HisumenaA Certain Magical Index: Imaginary Fest as Othinus
2020Arknights as CeobeTOUHOU Spell Bubble as Alice Margatroid
2021Scarlet Nexus as Kasane RandallGranblue Fantasy as AzusaGenshin Impact as Kujou SaraDead or Alive Xtreme Venus Vacation as EliseBlue Archive as Hasumi Hanekawa
2022Eve: Ghost Enemies as Lisa
Ghostwire: Tokyo as Mari

DubbingAnnabelle Comes Home as Mary Ellen (Madison Iseman)Bad Times at the El Royale as Emily Summerspring (Dakota Johnson)Carmen Sandiego as Carmen Sandiego (Gina Rodriguez)The Conjuring: The Devil Made Me Do It as Debbie Glatzel (Sarah Catherine Hook)Dolittle as Queen Victoria (Jessie Buckley)El Camino Christmas as Kate Daniels (Michelle Mylett)Going in Style as Brooklyn Harding (Joey King)Goosebumps as Hannah (Odeya Rush)Gossip Girl as Luna La (Zión Moreno)The Lost Daughter as Young Leda Caruso (Jessie Buckley)Paper Towns as Lacey Pemberton (Halston Sage)The 100'' as Clarke Griffin (Eliza Taylor)

References

External links
   
   
 

1993 births
Living people
Japanese voice actresses
Japanese video game actresses
Voice actresses from Saitama Prefecture
21st-century Japanese actresses